Rio Tinto Aluminium (previously known as Comalco) is now known as Rio Tinto Alcan after Rio's takeover of Alcan. It was the world's eighth largest aluminium company. It mines and manufactures bauxite, alumina and primary aluminium.

Rio Tinto Aluminium is a wholly owned subsidiary of Rio Tinto Group and provides about 20% of Australia's total production of bauxite, 8% of its alumina and 24% of its primary aluminium.

In 2002, Rio Tinto Aluminium earned US$256 million for its shareholder Rio Tinto.

In 2006 Rio Tinto Aluminium was the largest receiver of budgetary assistance from the Australian government, Rio Tinto Aluminium had received over $287 million in assistance from Australian tax dollars.

RTA owns the Weipa Bauxite mine, Yarwun Alumina Refinery, and Bell Bay aluminium smelter.

It also has interests (manages or joint-venture) in other aluminium related businesses:

 Boyne Smelters Ltd (aluminium smelter)
 New Zealand Aluminium Smelters Limited (Tiwai Point aluminium smelter)
 Queensland Alumina Limited (alumina refinery)
 Gladstone Power Station (power station)
 Anglesey Aluminium (aluminium smelter – closed September 2009)
 Eurallumina SpA (alumina refinery)(Now sold)

Weipa railway fleet 
In January 1972, Comalco (as the company was then known) ordered two Clyde GT26C locomotives (equivalent of the EMD SD40), numbered 1.001 and 1.002. A switcher was also imported from Canada, numbered 1.003. In 1994, 1.002 was sold to Westrail, which operated a fleet of GT26Cs, where it was renumbered as part of that railway's L class. The railway also acquired a prototype JT42C, GML10, from BHP, which was renumbered R1004 (1.001 was also renumbered R1001). In 2009, both R1001 and R1004 were sold to railways on the East Coast of Australia (1001 to El Zorro [renumbered L277] and 1004 to Qube Logistics [reverted to its original GML10 designation]), and were replaced by two production-model JT42Cs, R1005 and R1006. 1.003 was scrapped in 2000 after years of disuse.

Litigation
 Commonwealth Aluminium Corporation Ltd v Attorney-General of Queensland [1976] Qd R 231 (Comalco Case)

See also
 List of alumina refineries

External links
 Comalco web site
 AP Technology web site

Aluminium companies of Australia
Mining companies of Australia
Mining companies of Guinea